Mamman is a given name. Notable people with the name include:

Mamman Bello Ali (1958–2009), Nigerian Senator for Yobe South, Governor of Yobe State from 2007 to his death
Mamman Jiya Vatsa (1940–1986), Nigerian soldier and writer
Mamman Kontagora, Military Administrator of the Abuja Federal Capital Territory during the transitional regime of General Abdulsalam Abubakar
Sama’ila Mamman, elected Senator for the Katsina Central constituency of Katsina State, Nigeria
Saleh Mamman, Minister of power in Nigeria

See also
Ensamma mamman ("single mom") is a Swedish comic strip created by Cecilia Torudd

'Amman
Ammann
Hamman

Hammann
Mamane
Mammon

Mammone
Mamyan
Miamian